Henrik Martin "Rick" Sortun (September 26, 1942 – November 3, 2015) was a professional American football player who played offensive lineman for six seasons for the St. Louis Cardinals.

In his personal life, he was a committed Marxist, a member of the International Socialists, and a long-running president of the National Labor Relations Board Union.

References

1942 births
2015 deaths
Players of American football from Tacoma, Washington
American football offensive guards
St. Louis Cardinals (football) players
Washington Huskies football players
Sportspeople from Kent, Washington